Ehrenberg (German for "mountain of honor") may refer to:

Places
Germany
 Ehrenberg, Hesse, a town in the Fulda district
 Ehrenberg (mountain) in the northwest of Ehrenberg, Hesse
 Ehrenberg, Thuringia, a town in the Hildburghausen district
 Ehrenberg (Ilmenau), on which a part of the Hans-Stamm-Campus of Technische Universität Ilmenau is located
 Ehrenberg castle near Heinsheim village at the river Neckar, Baden-Württemberg
Austria
 Ehrenberg Castle (ruin) near Reutte in Tyrol, Austria
United States
 Ehrenberg, Arizona

People
 Ehrenberg (surname)

See also 
 Ehrenburg (disambiguation)
 Ehrenbaum
 Ehrenstein